Tatsama (lit. 'same as that') are Sanskrit loanwords in modern Indo-Aryan languages like Assamese, Bengali, Marathi, Nepali, Odia, Hindi, Gujarati, and Sinhala and in Dravidian languages like Malayalam and Telugu. They generally belong to a higher and more erudite register than common words, many of which are (in modern Indo-Aryan languages) directly inherited from Old Indo-Aryan (tadbhava). The tatsama register can be compared to the use of loan words of Greek or Latin origin in English (e.g. hubris).

Eastern Indo-Aryan

Bengali
The origin of tatsamas in Bengali is traced to 10th century Brahmin poets, who felt that the colloquial language was not suitable for their expressive needs. Another wave of tatsama vocabulary entered the then Bengali language by Sanskrit scholars teaching at Fort William College in Kolkata at the start of the 19th century. The textbooks used in these courses paved the way for more tatsama words entering common usage.

Bengali's lexicon is now about 40% tatsama (with about 58% tadbhava vocabulary inherited from Old Indo-Aryan via the Prakrit languages such as Apabhramsha and Avahaṭṭha). Writers such as Rabindranath Tagore, Michael Madhusudan Dutt, Ishwar Chandra Vidyasagar, and Bankim Chandra Chattopadhyay introduced a large number of tatsamas into Bengali.

Odia
Early Odia dictionaries such as Gitabhidhana (17th Century), Sabda Tattva Abhidhana (1916), Purnachandra Odia Bhashakosha (1931) and Promoda Abhidan (1942) list Sanskrit Tatsama vocabulary.

They are derived from Sanskrit verbal roots with the addition of suffixes and known in Odia as "tatsama krudanta".

Southern Indo-Aryan

Sinhala
The way the tatsama entered the Sinhala language is comparable to what is found in Bengali language: they are scholarly borrowings of Sanskrit or Pali terms. Tatsama in Sinhala can be identified by their ending exclusively in -ya or -va, whereas native Sinhala words tend to show a greater array of endings. Many scientific concepts make use of tatsama, for instance grahaņaya 'eclipse', but they are also found for more everyday concepts.

Western Indo-Aryan

For the most part, the western Indo-Aryan languages such as Punjabi, Sindhi, Hindko, and Saraiki do not use tatsama vocabulary. The majority of words in these languages are inherited from Prakrit or borrowed from Persian and Arabic. The notable exception in the group of western Indo-Aryan languages is Hindustani, which began with most of its borrowed vocabulary coming from Persian, and in recent history has incorporated a larger amount of learned borrowings from Sanskrit. Many of these, however, are borrowed indirectly from Bengali or Marathi, or given meanings based on English or Perso-Arabic derived words already in use in Hindustani. Any tatsama vocabulary occurring in Punjabi is borrowed from Hindi/Urdu, and likewise tatsama words in languages spoken further west are likely to be indirect loans of Hindi/Urdu words used in Punjabi. Very few of these are used in colloquial speech, and their use tends to be limited to formal settings or Hindu religious contexts.

Dravidian

Malayalam
Malayalam has many tatsama words, which are used in  written and spoken language depending on registerand dialect.

For example:
 Abhimanam- Pride
 Abhyasam- Practice
 Vidhya- Education
 Vishudham- Holy
 Vishwasam- Believe
 Swasam- Breath
 Vichaaram- Thought
 Bodham- Sense
 Shatru- Enemy
 Rakshakan- Saviour
 Akasham- Sky
 Svargam- Heaven
 Pustakam- Book
 Swapanam- Dream
 Premam - Love
 Ullasam- Merriment
 Sareeram- Body
 Daivam- God

Telugu
Sanskrit influenced the Telugu language for about 500 years. During 1000-1100 AD, Nannaya's Telugu in Mahabharata, Telugu in several inscriptions, Telugu in poetry reestablished its roots and dominated over the royal language, Sanskrit. Telugu absorbed the Tatsamas from Sanskrit.

Metrical poetry in Telugu ('Chandassu') uses meters such as Utpalamala, Champakamala, Mattebham, Sardoola, Sragdhara, Bhujangaprayata etc.. which are pure Sanskrit meters.

Telugu has many tatsama words, known as prakriti. The equivalent colloquial words are called vikrutis, meaning "distorted". Prakriti are used only as a medium of instruction in educational institutions, offices etc. Today, spoken Telugu contains both prakruthi and vikruthi words.

For example:
 Bhōjanam (food) is prakriti and bōnam is vikruti.
 Vidya (education) is prakriti and viddhe is vikriti.
 Rākshasi (female demon) is prakriti and rākāsi/rakkasi is vikriti.
 Drishti (sight) is prakriti and dishti is vikriti.
 Shūnya (zero) is prakriti and sunnā is vikriti.

References

Lists of loanwords
Sanskrit words and phrases
Etymology